Bayangol, or Bayingolin (Mongolian: rich river) may refer to:

Mongolia 
 Bayangol, Ulan Bator, a düüreg (city district) in the capital of Mongolia
several Sums (districts) in different Aimags (provinces) in Mongolia
 Bayangol, Selenge
 Bayangol, Övörkhangai

China 
 Bayingolin Mongol Autonomous Prefecture

several Towns in different Banners (counties), Inner Mongolia

 , a sum (township) in the Alxa Right Banner, Inner Mongolia
 , a village in the Uxin Banner, Inner Mongolia
 , a river in Hejing County, Xinjiang
 , a river in Delingha City, Qinghai

Russia
several ulus in different districts, Republic of Buryatia
 Bayangol, Khorinsky
 Bayangol, Zakamensky
 Bayangol, Barguzinsky